Manuel Gavilán (30 November 1920 — 8 March 2010) was a Paraguayan football defender who played for Paraguay in the 1950 FIFA World Cup. He also played for Club Libertad.

References

External links

1920 births
2010 deaths
Paraguayan footballers
Paraguay international footballers
Association football defenders
Club Libertad footballers
1950 FIFA World Cup players
Copa América-winning players